Helcystogramma tristellum is a moth in the family Gelechiidae. It was described by Snellen in 1901. It is found in the Philippines and on Java.

References

Moths described in 1901
tristellum
Insects of the Philippines
Moths of Asia